The Great McGonagall may refer to:

 William McGonagall, a Scottish poet often known by this name
 The Great McGonagall (film), a 1974 British comedy film about McGonagall